Waters House may refer to:

Waters Farm, Sutton, Massachusetts, listed on the NRHP in Massachusetts
Waters House (Fordyce, Arkansas), listed on the NRHP in Arkansas
Waters House (Sevierville, Tennessee), listed on the NRHP in Tennessee
Asa Waters Mansion, Millbury, Massachusetts, listed on the NRHP in Massachusetts
Charles Clary Waters House, Little Rock, Arkansas, listed on the NRHP in Arkansas

See also
Waters Building (disambiguation)